Ro-100 may refer to:

, an Imperial Japanese Navy submarine commissioned in 1942 and sunk in 1943
, a class of Imperial Japanese Navy submarines